Sinezona macleani is a minute species of sea snail, a marine gastropod mollusk or micromollusk in the family Scissurellidae, the little slit shells.

Description

Distribution

References

 Geiger D.L. (2006). Eight new species of Scissurellidae and Anatomidae (Mollusca: Gastropoda: Vetigastropoda) from around the world, with discussion of two senior synonyms. Zootaxa 1128:1–33.
 Geiger D.L. (2012) Monograph of the little slit shells. Volume 1. Introduction, Scissurellidae. pp. 1–728. Volume 2. Anatomidae, Larocheidae, Depressizonidae, Sutilizonidae, Temnocinclidae. pp. 729–1291. Santa Barbara Museum of Natural History Monographs Number 7

Scissurellidae
Gastropods described in 2006